The 2022 WGC-Dell Technologies Match Play was the 23rd WGC Match Play, played March 23–27 at Austin Country Club in Austin, Texas.

The tournament was won by 2021 runner-up Scottie Scheffler, who defeated Kevin Kisner 4 and 3 in the final. With the win, Scheffler's third in his last five starts, he rose to number one in the Official World Golf Ranking for the first time. Corey Conners beat Dustin Johnson 3 and 1 in the consolation match to claim third place.

Format
The 64 players were placed into four seeded pools, the 16 highest ranked players as of March 21 in Pool A, the next 16 in Pool B, etc. The top seeds (Pool A) are placed into 16 groups in order, with the groups completed by means of a random draw of one player from each of the remaining pools.

Each group was played as a round-robin of match play matches, held on Wednesday, Thursday and Friday, with one point awarded for a win and half a point for a tie. The 16 group winners advanced to the knockout stage. If two or more players are tied on points at the end of the group stage, there was a sudden death stroke play playoff between the tied players to determine the winner of the group.

In the knockout stage, the round of 16 was played on Saturday morning, with the quarterfinals on Saturday afternoon. The semifinals were played on Sunday morning, and the final and third place playoff were played on Sunday afternoon. In total, barring withdrawals, those reaching the last four played seven rounds of golf.

Field
The following players qualified for the field, consisting of the top 64 players available from the Official World Golf Ranking on March 15. They are listed with their world ranking as of March 21, which determined the seedings, and their world ranking as of March 15, which determined qualification, in parentheses.

Pools

 Cameron Smith (6), Rory McIlroy (7), Hideki Matsuyama (11), Sam Burns (17), Harris English (22) and Phil Mickelson (45) did not play.

Results

Pool play
Players were divided into 16 groups of four players and play round-robin matches Wednesday to Friday.
Round 1 – March 23
Round 2 – March 24
Round 3 – March 25

Group 1

Group 2

Group 3

Zalatoris defeated Hovland on the second hole of a sudden-death playoff with a birdie.

Group 4

Group 5

Scheffler defeated Fitzpatrick on the sixth hole of a sudden-death playoff with a birdie.

Group 6

Group 7

Kanaya defeated Herbert on the first hole of a sudden-death playoff with a par.

Group 8

Group 9

Group 10

Group 11

Group 12

Group 13

Group 14

Na defeated McNealy on the first hole of a sudden-death playoff with a birdie.

Group 15

Group 16

Final 16 bracket

Prize money breakdown

Prize money for players who did not qualify for the knockout stage was from $164,000 to $40,000. Positions for these players were based on points scored in pool play.

Source:

Notes

References

External links

Coverage on the European Tour's official site
Media Guide

WGC Match Play
Golf in Texas
Sports in Austin, Texas
WGC-Dell Technologies Match Play Championship
WGC-Dell Technologies Match Play Championship
WGC-Dell Technologies Match Play Championship
WGC-Dell Technologies Match Play Championship
.